Protoschinia was a genus of moths of the family Noctuidae.

Protoschinia scutosa, the only species in the genus was considered a synonym of Schinia nuchalis, but is now treated as a valid species. The genus was revalidated by Beck in 1996, but it is unclear if this is widely accepted since many authors still classify scutosa in the genus Schinia.

References
Natural History Museum Lepidoptera genus database

Heliothinae